In Our Nature is the second studio album by Swedish singer-songwriter José González. It was released on 24 September 2007 on Peacefrog Records in the UK and Imperial Recordings in Sweden. It was released on 25 September 2007 by Mute Records in the United States. The album received generally positive reviews from critics: on Metacritic, it has a score of 72 out of 100 based on 27 reviews, indicating "generally favourable reviews".

The album's lyrics address the human condition, or the nature that the title refers to. Though the sonic palette features classical guitar and vocal melody, as in his debut Veneer, it is occasionally expanded. Hand claps, backing vocals and synthesizer are some notable additions.

In Sweden, the first single was "Killing for Love", whereas in the rest of Europe it was "Down the Line". Both singles came with the same B-side, a cover of "Smalltown Boy" by Bronski Beat. The second single released was "Teardrop" (backed with the exclusive instrumental B-side "Four Forks Ache"), and the third single was another split--"Killing for Love" in the UK, and "Down the Line" in Sweden. Both singles came with the same B-side, "Neon Lights".

Track listing

Singles
 "Down the Line" (10 September 2007) (UK)
 "Killing for Love" (19 September 2007) (Sweden)
 "Teardrop" (12 November 2007)
 "Down the Line" (20 February 2008) (Sweden)
 "Killing for Love" (7 April 2008) (UK)

Remix EP
 "Killing for Love" (Todd Terje Brokeback Mix) 
 "How Low" (Pechenga Nord-Norska Mix) 
 "Killing for Love" (Beatfanatic Remix) 
 "In Our Nature" (Landberg & Skogehall Mix) 
 "Storm" (Pocketknife's TuBa 303 Remix)

Personnel
José González – vocals, guitar
Yukimi Nagano – backing vocals
Erik Bodin – percussion
Håkan Wirenstrand – synthesiser

Charts

Weekly charts

Year-end charts

Certifications

References

2007 albums
Mute Records albums
José González (singer) albums